Miguel Ángel González (born August 10, 1983 in Avellaneda), known as El Mágico, is a retired Argentine footballer. Previously, he played for Unión San Felipe and O'Higgins.

He took part in the 2010 Copa Sudamericana, after his team Unión San Felipe previously won the 2009 Copa Chile, playing in four matches and scoring a goal in the preliminary tie against Guaraní, before eventually being eliminated in the Round of 16 by LDU Quito.

In May 2011 he was linked with a move to Romanian club FC Brașov, where he would meet former team-mates Juan Toloza and David Distéfano. Reportedly he refused the move.

References

External links
 Profile at BDFA
 

1983 births
Living people
Sportspeople from Avellaneda
Argentine footballers
Argentine expatriate footballers
Club Atlético Platense footballers
Club de Gimnasia y Esgrima La Plata footballers
Ferro Carril Oeste footballers
Selangor FA players
Sportivo Italiano footballers
General Lamadrid footballers
Racing de Olavarría footballers
Huracán de Tres Arroyos footballers
Club Atlético Atlanta footballers
Unión San Felipe footballers
O'Higgins F.C. footballers
Colo-Colo footballers
Colo-Colo B footballers
Primera Nacional players
Argentine Primera División players
Malaysia Premier League players
Primera B Metropolitana players
Primera C Metropolitana players
Torneo Argentino A players
Chilean Primera División players
Segunda División Profesional de Chile players
Primera B de Chile players
Expatriate footballers in Malaysia
Argentine expatriate sportspeople in Malaysia
Expatriate footballers in Chile
Argentine expatriate sportspeople in Chile
Association football midfielders